Glenrothes is a town situated in the heart of Fife, in east-central Scotland. The town had a population of 39,277 in the 2011 census, making it the third largest settlement in Fife and the 18th most populous settlement in Scotland. The name Glenrothes comes from its historical link with the Earl of Rothes, who owned much of the land on which the new town has been built; Glen (Scottish for valley) was added to the name to avoid confusion with Rothes in Moray and in recognition that the town lies in a river valley.

Planned in the late 1940s as one of Scotland's first post-second world war new towns, its original purpose was to house miners who were to work at a newly established coal mine, the Rothes Colliery. After the mine closed, the town developed as an important industrial centre playing a major role in developing Scotland's Silicon Glen between 1961 and 2000, with several major electronics and hi-tech companies setting up facilities in the town. The Glenrothes Development Corporation (GDC), a quasi-autonomous non-governmental organisation, was established to develop, manage and promote the new town. The GDC, supported by the local authority, oversaw the governance of Glenrothes until the GDC was wound up in 1995, after which all responsibility was transferred to Fife Council.

Glenrothes is the administrative capital of Fife, containing the headquarters of both Fife Council and Police Scotland Fife Division and is a major service centre within the area. It is also a centre for excellence within the high-tech electronics and manufacturing industry sectors; several organisations have their global headquarters in Glenrothes. Major employers include Bosch Rexroth (hydraulics manufacturing), Fife College (education), Leviton (fibre optics manufacturing) and Raytheon (defence and electronics). Glenrothes is unique in Fife as much of the town centre floorspace is internalised within Fife's largest shopping centre, the Kingdom Shopping Centre. Public facilities include a regional sports and leisure centre, two golf courses, major parks, a civic centre and theatre and a college campus.

The town has won multiple horticultural awards in the Beautiful Scotland and Britain in Bloom contests for the quality of its parks and landscaping. It has numerous outdoor sculptures and artworks, a result of the appointment of town artists in the early development of the town. The A92 trunk road provides the principal access to the town, passing through Glenrothes and connecting it to the wider Scottish motorway and trunk road network. A major bus station is located in the town centre, providing regional and local bus services to surrounding settlements.

History

Toponymy
The name Rothes comes from the association with the Earl of Rothes, of the Leslie family from Northeast Scotland. This family historically owned much of the land on which Glenrothes has been built, and gave its name to the adjacent village of Leslie. "Glen" (from the Scottish Gaelic word gleann meaning valley) was added to prevent confusion with Rothes in Moray, and to reflect the location of the town within the River Leven valley.

The different areas ("precincts") of Glenrothes have been named after the hamlets that were already established in the area (e.g. Cadham, Woodside), the farms which formally occupied the land (e.g. Caskieberran, Collydean, Rimbleton) or the historical estate homes in the area (e.g. Balbirnie, Balgeddie, Leslie Parks).

Early Known Settlement

Glenrothes is home to the remains of ancient stone circles which can be seen at Balbirnie and Balfarg in the northeast of the town. The Balfarg henge was constructed around 3,000BC and contains the remnants of a stone circle which has been partly reconstructed.
The henge was excavated between 1977 and 1978 prior to the development of a new housing estate. The Balbirnie henge which is only located approximately 500m away from Balfarg was excavated between 1970 and 1971. In order to allow widening of the A92 the stones were moved a short distance to a new location at North Lodge and reconstructed as nearly as possible in the original way. The stone circle has been carbon dated as being from the Bronze Age. It is thought that the Balbrinie stone circle and the Balfarg circle once formed part of a larger ceremonial complex.

There are a number of former country houses located in Glenrothes. Balbirnie House, a category-A listed Georgian period building, was bought along with its grounds in 1969 by the GDC from the Balfour family to be developed as Balbirnie Park and golf course. The house was later occupied and restored by the GDC in 1981, to stop the property falling into disrepair. This led to potential interest and the house was converted into a four-star hotel in 1989. The B-listed former stable block of the house was converted into a craft centre. Balgeddie House, a C-Listed former Edwardian residence of Sir Robert Spencer Nairn located in the northwest of the town, has also been converted into a high quality hotel. Leslie House, the category-A listed 17th century former home of the Earl of Rothes (Clan Leslie), became a care home for the elderly in 1945; owned by the Church of Scotland. The building was in the process of being renovated, when the interior and roof of the house were destroyed by a fire in February 2009. However, proposals to restore the mansion were approved in 2019. Much of the former grounds of Leslie House have been used to create Riverside Park. Collydean precinct hosts a ruin of a 17th-century house called Pitcairn House which was built for and first occupied by Archibald Pitcairne famous Scottish physician.

Glenrothes new town
Glenrothes was designated in 1948 under the New Towns Act 1946 as Scotland's second post-war new town. The planning, development, management and promotion of the new town was the responsibility of the Glenrothes Development Corporation (GDC), a quango appointed by the Secretary of State for Scotland. The corporation board consisted of eight members including a chairman and deputy chairman. The first meeting of the GDC was in Auchmuty House, provided by Tullis Russell on 20 June 1949.

The original plan was to build a new settlement for a population of 32,000 to 35,000. The land which Glenrothes now occupies was largely agricultural, and once contained a number of small rural communities and the hamlets of Cadham and Woodside, which were established to house workers at local paper mills. The original proposals for the new town would have centred it on Markinch; however the village's infrastructure was deemed unable to withstand the substantial growth that would be needed for a new town of the scale proposed and there was considerable local opposition to the plans. Much of the historical Aytoun, Balfour, Balgonie and Rothes estates were included in Glenrothes' assigned area along with the historical country houses Balbirnie House, Balgeddie House and Leslie House.

Unlike the other post-war Scottish new towns of Cumbernauld, East Kilbride, Irvine and Livingston, Glenrothes was not originally to be a Glasgow overspill new town, although it did later take this role. It was however populated in the early 1950s, in part by families moving from the declining coalfield areas of Scotland. It is also the only Scottish new town to not take its name from an existing settlement and in that respect was a completely new settlement.

Industrial history
Before Glenrothes was developed, the main industries in the area were papermaking, coal mining and farming. Local paper manufacturers included the Tullis Russell and Dixons Mills near Markinch in the east and the Fettykil and Prinlaws Mills to the west at Leslie. The papermills established along the banks of the River Leven which provided energy to power their operations.

Scotland had emerged from the Second World War in a strong position both to contribute to the UK's post-war reconstruction, and to help repay heavy overseas debt incurred in rearmament and six years of war. At the heart of government strategy was the need to produce energy, and the first focus of the resulting industrial renewal was massive investment by the state in the Scottish coal industry. The case for developing Glenrothes was partially driven by this strategy, and was further advanced in a report produced in 1946 by Sir Frank Mears to the Central and South-East Scotland Planning Committee. This specifically made the case for a new town in the Leslie-Markinch area to support growth in the coal mining industry in Fife.

The Rothes Colliery, the new coal mine associated with the town's development, was built on land to the west of Thornton, an established village south of Glenrothes. The mine, which was officially opened by Queen Elizabeth II in 1957, was promoted as a key driver in the economic regeneration of central Fife. However, un-stemmable flooding and geological problems in the area combined with a lessening demand for coal nationally made the mine less viable, and it was closed in 1965. Ironically, miners who had worked in older deep pits in the area had warned against the development of the Rothes pit for this very reason.

On 28 May 1963 Cadco Development Ltd held a press conference in Edinburgh to announce that they were bringing 2,000 jobs to Glenrothes. They were going to take three factories on the Queensway Industrial Estate; open pig breeding units at Whitehill; and build a supermarket in the town centre. Cadco's board of directors included the film star George Sanders and his wife Benita Hume alongside Denis Loraine and Tom Roe (Thomas Chambers Windsor Roe). Denis Loraine soon persuaded the Glenrothes Development Corporation that the construction work should be carried out by Cadco's own building company, which had opened a depot in nearby Kirkcaldy.

By May 1964 Cadco were confident that their factories would soon start production, but by October all work had stopped because the Cadco Building Company had not paid its sub-contractors and suppliers. It transpired that Cadco did not have the money to back up its plans; and the banks and small companies who had respectively paid for and done the advance work found themselves out of pocket; and its employees lost their jobs. It turned out that the money the development corporation had paid to Cadco for building work had been used instead to help the failing Royal Victoria Sausages Company in Brighton. When the scam was exposed, the town's MP Willie Hamilton posed questions in the House of Commons and a Board of Trade inquiry was set up. As the hoped-for jobs evaporated, the development corporation, the Royal Bank of Scotland and others involved had to explain to the Board of Trade inspectors how they been taken in by Denis Loraine and Cadco. However no-one was ever prosecuted for their part in the affair in the United Kingdom. Historians speculate that this was because of the involvement, direct and indirect, of people in high places, particularly future Prime Minister, Edward Heath and Hollywood actress Jayne Mansfield. Investors alleged to be compromised by the scandal ranged from novelist Graham Greene to Charlie Chaplin. After the scandal broke, Loraine fled to the United States, only avoiding a long prison sentence by working under cover to help bring to justice those behind the biggest counterfeiting operation in US history.

The closure of the Rothes Colliery almost halted the further development of Glenrothes, but soon afterwards, central government changed the town's role by appointing it as an economic focal point for Central Scotland as part of a Regional Plan for economic growth and development. The Glenrothes Development Corporation were able to use this status to attract a plethora of light industries and modern electronics factories to the town. The first big overseas electronic investor was Beckmans Instruments in 1959, followed by Hughes Industries in the early 1960s. A number of other important companies followed, establishing Glenrothes as a major industrial hub in Scotland's Silicon Glen. In the mid-1970s, the town also replaced Cupar as the HQ of Fife Regional Council, making it the administrative centre of Fife.

Major industrial estates were developed to the south of Glenrothes, largely because it was near the proposed East Fife Regional Road (A92) which was developed in 1989, giving dual carriageway access to the main central Scotland road network. The rapid growth experienced in Silicon Glen peaked in the 1990s with Canon developing their first UK manufacturing plant at Westwood Park in Glenrothes in 1992. ADC Telecommunications, a major American electronics company, established a base at Bankhead in early 2000 with the promise of a substantial number of jobs. Around the start of the 21st century, a decline in major electronics manufacturing in Scotland affected the town's economy, and thus the industrial base of the town was forced to diversify for the second time in its short history. By 2004 both ADC and Canon had closed their Glenrothes operations, with much of the promised jobs growth failing to materialise. This was largely due to the electronics industrial sector in Glenrothes and most of central Scotland being dependent upon an inward investment strategy that led to almost 43% of employment in foreign-owned plants which were susceptible to changes in global economic markets.

Post-New Town History
The GDC was finally wound up in 1995 after which responsibility for Glenrothes was largely transferred to Fife Council with assets such as the Kingdom Shopping Centre, industrial and office units sold off to private sector companies. Since the winding up of the GDC Glenrothes continues to serve as Fife's principal administrative centre and serves a wider sub-regional area as a major centre for services and employment.

In 2008, coinciding with the town's 60th anniversary, Canadian artist and researcher Sylvia Grace Borda chose to holiday for a week in Glenrothes. She was curious to explore the town as if she were a late-1960s photographer of common places, following on from a similar study of East Kilbride. The outcome was the production of a series of images which the artist believes contradict how some Scots would 'see' Glenrothes, reinforcing the observation that it often takes a visitor to see what others take for granted. The work sought to position itself so the everyday environment can cause the viewer to pause and regard the commonplace as extraordinary.

Annual awards that were set up by Urban Realm and Carnyx Group in the mid-2000s to challenge the quality of built environments in Scotland saw Glenrothes awarded their Carbuncle Award in 2009. The judges awarded Glenrothes the category of the most dismal place in Scotland for its "depressed and investment starved town centre". This generated mixed and polarized views from locals and built environment professionals alike. In the immediate aftermath of the award Urban Realm hosted a conference in the town named 'Saving Down Towns' to try to underline how great Glenrothes could be. Planners and architects were brought along to suggest possible ways forward for the town, as well as to discuss the challenges facing Scotland's urban centres in general.

Paradoxically in 2010 the town won awards for being the "Best Kept Large Town" and the most "Clean, sustainable and beautiful community" in Scotland in the Beautiful Scotland competition and was the winner in the "large town" category in the 2011 Royal Horticultural Society Britain in Bloom competition. The town continued its horticultural success by achieving further Gold awards in the 2013 and 2014 UK finals.

In 2011 then Historic Scotland completed an assessment of the town art in Glenrothes, ultimately awarding listed status to a number of artworks scattered throughout the town. The organisation also gave positive recognition to Glenrothes' significant role in helping to create the idea of art being a key factor in creating a sense of place.

Glenrothes' place and importance in the history and development of Scotland has been enshrined in the Great Tapestry of Scotland, which was unveiled in 2013 in the Scottish Parliament. The Glenrothes panel shows various pieces of the town's public artworks, along with visual references to its important industrial heritage associated originally with coal mining and later as a major centre for "Silicon Glen" industries.

In mid-2015 Tullis Russell Papermakers, a stalwart to the local area economy for around 200 years, went into administration. The Scottish Government and Fife Council established a taskforce to help mitigate the effects of job losses and put in place appropriate support for a sustainable future for the area. Around £6 million was set aside to support the Fife Taskforce's Action Plan which included projects such as the Queensway Technology Park; supporting the regeneration of Queensway Industrial Estate to develop a modern business and technology park which can utilise the proximity to RWE's Biomass Power Generation facility and to a Green Data Centre. The Glenrothes Enterprise Hub was another project delivered as a result of the task force support. Proposals to redevelop the site of the former mills for mixed uses including around 800 new homes, retail, businesses and industry are progressing.

The Glenrothes Energy Network was progressed in 2017 to utilise the heat from the RWE Markinch Biomass CHP plant which was formally opened in March 2015. The project was a collaboration between Fife Council, RWE and the Scottish Government. It was awarded Scottish Government funding in May 2017 as part of the Scottish Energy Strategy, which aims to deliver around 50 per cent of the energy required for Scotland's heat, transport and electricity needs from renewable sources by 2030. Construction of the heat network commenced in June 2018 and the network became operational in April 2019 making it Scotland's first 100% renewable biomass heat and power district network. The network was officially opened by the Scottish Minister for Energy, Connectivity and the Islands, Paul Wheelhouse. In 2019 the project won the Cities & Communities award at the Decentralized Energy Awards organised by the Association for Decentralised Energy. It supplies low carbon heat to Council offices, local businesses and homes in Glenrothes.

Governance

In the early years of the creation of the new town the Glenrothes Development Corporation (GDC) with input from the local authority, then Fife County Council and Kirkcaldy District Council, oversaw the governance. There were proposals to formally establish a Glenrothes District Council but this was overtaken by proposals for broader local government reorganisation that took place in the 1990s. Also in the early 1990s the then Conservative UK Government established a wind-up order for all of the UK's new town development corporations. Responsibilities for the assets, management and governance of all of the new towns were to be transferred to either private sector companies, or to the local authorities or other government organisations.

Glenrothes is represented by a number of tiers of elected government. North Glenrothes Community Council and Pitteuchar, Stenton and Finglassie Community Council form the lowest tier of governance whose statutory role is to communicate local opinion to local and central government. Glenrothes now lies within one of the 32 council areas of Scotland. Fife Council is the executive, deliberative and legislative body responsible for local governance in the region and has its main headquarters in Glenrothes. Council meetings take place in Fife House (formerly known as Glenrothes House) in the town centre. The west wing of the building was built by the Glenrothes Development Corporation (GDC) as their offices in 1969, which was later used as the headquarters of Fife Regional Council.

Glenrothes forms part of the county constituency of Glenrothes, electing one Member of Parliament (MP) to the House of Commons of the Parliament of the United Kingdom by the first past the post system. Peter Grant of the Scottish National Party is the MP for Glenrothes after being elected in the 2015 general election and the snap election in 2017. For the purposes of the Scottish Parliament, Glenrothes forms part of the Mid Fife and Glenrothes constituency following the 2011 Scottish elections. This constituency replaced the former Central Fife constituency. Each constituency elects one Member of the Scottish Parliament (MSP) by the first past the post system of election, and the region elects seven additional members to produce a form of proportional representation. Following the 2016 and 2021 Scottish Elections the constituency is represented by Jenny Gilruth MSP of the Scottish National Party.

Geography

Glenrothes lies in mid-Fife between the agricultural Howe of Fife in the north and east and Fife's industrial heartland in the south and west. Its immediate neighbouring settlements are Coaltown of Balgonie, Leslie, Markinch and Thornton, the boundaries of which are virtually indistinguishable from Glenrothes' forming a contiguous urban area. The villages of Kinglassie, Milton of Balgonie and Star of Markinch are located slightly further away and are physically separated from Glenrothes by farmland.

The northern parts of the settlement lie upland on the southern fringes of the Lomond Hills Regional Park. The central parts of the town extend between the Warout Ridge and the southern edge of the River Leven valley; a substantial green space which passes east west through the town. Southern parts of Glenrothes are largely industrial and are situated on land which gently slopes south towards the Lochty Burn and the village of Thornton. Temperatures in Glenrothes, like the rest of Scotland, are relatively moderate given its northern latitude. Fife is a peninsula, located between the Firth of Tay in the north, the Firth of Forth in the south and the North Sea in the east. Summers are relatively cool and the warming of the water over the summer results in warm winters.

A linked network of semi-natural landscape areas throughout the town allow for a mix of biodiversity with different flora and fauna and wildlife habitats. Areas of ancient woodland are found in Riverside Park and Balbirnie Park, both of which are also designated historic gardens and designed landscapes. Balbirnie Park is renowned for having a large collection of rhododendron species. Protected wildlife species found in the Glenrothes area include red squirrels, water voles and various types of bats. Landscape areas also act as natural drainage systems, reducing the likelihood of flooding in the built up areas of the town, with rainwater flows channelled to the River Leven, or to the Lochty Burn. Landscape planning has also ensured that Glenrothes' road network, with particular focuses on the town's many roundabouts, provides green networks throughout the town.

Built environment and urban form
Careful consideration was given to the form and infrastructure of the town, focusing on the creation of individual suburban type neighbourhoods (precincts), each with their own architectural identity. Engineers, planners, builders and architects were tasked with creating not only good quality mass-produced housing but green spaces, tree planting, wildlife corridors and soft and hard landscaping. This was seen as an equally important part of the process, helping to provide a sense of place and connection to the land that a New Town was felt to need in order to become a successful place where people would want to live and raise children. Separating industry from housing areas in planned industrial estates was a key element of early plans. This was at the time seen as an important change from the "chaotic", congested and polluted industrial towns and cities of the previous centuries where cramped unsanitary housing and dirty industries were built in close proximity to one another.

The vision for Glenrothes was to provide a clean, healthy and safe environment for the town's residents and much of the housing, as in most other new towns (especially in Scotland) took the form of council housing built by the Glenrothes Development Corporation. The provision of council housing, part of a nation-wide trend towards this type of tenure, gave the local development corporation an even greater overall ability to implement its vision of a planned built environment while also fulfilling one of the primary aims of the new towns: to create affordable housing for workers in areas that were to be centres of new industry and economic growth. The new homes simultaneously provided affordable housing for people being relocated from crowded "slum" areas in the industrial Central Belt (and Glasgow in particular), though the latter was less of priority for Glenrothes initially compared to other Scottish new towns such as East Kilbride and Cumbernauld which were more specifically planned to fulfill a so-called "overspill" function.

The settlement has been purposely planned using a series of masterplans. Development of Glenrothes started in Woodside in the east and progressed westwards with the first town masterplan implemented as far as South Parks and Rimbleton housing precincts. Early neighbourhoods were based on Ebenezer Howard's Garden City philosophy, using relatively tried and tested principles of town planning and architecture which is reflected in their housing styles and layouts. The first town masterplan sub-divided the town's designated area into self-contained residential precincts with their own primary schools, local shops and community facilities, consistent with other new towns being built elsewhere in the UK in the same period.

A second town masterplan was then developed in the late 1960s following Glenrothes' change of role and was to accommodate an increased population of 50,000–70,000. New areas of land in the north and south of the designated area were identified for new development. The road network was redsiegned and upgraded to deal with projected increases in car ownership and new housing estates were developed to the west, then to the south and finally to the north of the designated area.

The housing precincts of the 1960s and 1970s, developed under the second masterplan, departed slightly from the garden city ideals instead adopting Radburn principles; separating as far as practical footpaths from roads. The housing precincts were designed to better accommodate increases in car ownership which increased significantly from the 1960s onwards. The townscape changed in this period seeing more use of contemporary architectural styles of the time and newer forms of development layouts. Terraced housing and blocks of flats were predominantly developed and housing designs also used flat roofed and mono pitch roof styles to create variety. The fronts of houses were in many instances designed to face onto public footpaths and open spaces.  Car parking was kept either to the rear of properties or in parking bays located nearby in efforts to minimise conflict with pedestrians. Housing precincts from the 1980s onwards were largely developed by the private sector with the majority of this housing developed in low density suburban cul-de-sacs. Areas of structural planting, tree belts and open spaces were purposely designed to blend housing and factories into the hillsides and local landscape.

Geology
The Glenrothes area's geology is predominantly made up of glacial deposits with the subsoil largely consisting of boulder clay with a band of sand and gravel in the area to the north of the River Leven. The river valley largely comprises alluvium deposits and there are also igneous intrusions of olivine dolerite throughout the area. Productive coal measures were largely recorded in the southern parts of Glenrothes, approximately south of the line of the B921 Kinglassie road. These coal measures form part of the East Fife coalfield and prior to 1962 the deposits there were to be worked by the Rothes Colliery, until it was found that there were severe issues with water penetration and subsequent flooding. Smaller limestone coal outcrops that had been historically worked were recorded around the Balbirnie and Cadham/Balfarg areas with the land that is now Gilvenbank Park found particularly to be heavily undermined.

Demography

In 1950 the population in the Glenrothes designated area was about 1,000 people, located in the hamlets of Woodside and Cadham and in the numerous farm steadings that were spread throughout the area. Population growth in the early phases of the town was described as slow due to the dependence on the growth of jobs at the Rothes Colliery. In 1960 the town population was shown to have increased to 12,499 people, and it had risen to 28,098 by 1969. The fastest growth was between 1964 and 1969, with average inward migration of 1,900 persons per year. In 1981 Glenrothes' population was estimated at 35,000 and at the time the GDC was disbanded in 1995 it was estimated to be just over 40,000.

The 2001 census recorded the population of Glenrothes at 38,679 representing 11% of Fife's total population. The 2011 census recorded a 1.5% population rise to 39,277.

The total population in the wider Glenrothes area was estimated at 49,817 in 23,596 households in 2022. 61% of the population is of working age (16–64 years). Glenrothes is similar to Fife for the percentage of homes which are owner occupied (62%) social rented (25%) or private rented (11%). The Area has a higher employment rate (74.5%), and a lower rate of those who are classed
as economically inactive (21.8%) than Fife. Employment (10.9%) and income deprivation (13.8%) are just above the levels for Fife as a whole. 91.9% of 16-19 year olds are participating in education, employment or training, showing similar patterns to Fife across all categories. The Glenrothes (UK Parliament constituency) Area's median weekly income was calculated at £559.10 (residents earnings) and £567.10 (workplace earnings) in 2022.

The working age population of the town in 2011 was 29,079 as recorded by the census. The percentage of population economically active in Glenrothes was recorded at 75.2% in 2021. The number of Jobseekers Allowance (JSA) and Universal Credit (UC) claimants at December 2022 in the Glenrothes area was 970 representing a 3.2% rate, consistent with the Scottish average, but lower than the Fife and UK averages of 3.4% and 3.7%. Scottish Index of Multiple Deprivation (SIMD) figures indicate that Auchmuty, Cadham, Collydean, Macedonia and Tanshall areas in Glenrothes fall within the 20% most deprived communities category in Scotland.

Economy
The Glenrothes area's economy predominantly comprises manufacturing and engineering industries, service sector, health and public sector jobs. In 2016, around 27,190 people were employed in the Glenrothes area; approximately 16% of the 164,500 jobs in Fife. Glenrothes is recognised for having the main concentration of advanced manufacturing and engineering companies in Fife. There are a total of 46 "Top 200 Fife Businesses" located in Glenrothes and there was a recorded  of industrial and business floorpace within the town's employment areas following a survey carried out in 2014 with the largest concentrations of premises in the south of the town and around the town centre. Major employment areas in Glenrothes include: Bankhead, Eastfield, Pentland Park, Queensway, Southfield, Viewfield, Westwood Park and Whitehill.

Industry

The 2011 Census showed that manufacturing accounted for almost 15% of employment in Glenrothes. In 2015 this amounted to over 4,000 jobs in the local area, or almost a third of all manufacturing jobs in Fife. A number of high tech industrial companies are located in the town largely specialised in electronics manufacturing making the Glenrothes area one of Scotland's largest clusterings of electronics companies. These are what remain of Silicon Glen operations in the area which gradually reduced and then consolidated since the peak in the late 1990s. Local companies specialised in this sector include Compugraphics which develops photomasks for the microelectronics sector, CTDI (formally Regenersis) which provides technology repair and test services, Leviton (previously Brand Rex) which produces fibre optic cabling, Raytheon which specialises in electronics for the defence industry and Semefab which produces Micro Electric Mechanical Systems (MEMS). Other major companies which have established a base in Glenrothes include Bosch Rexroth (hydraulics manufacturing), FiFab (precision engineering) and Velux (Window and Skylight Manufacturers).

In 2013 Indian beverages group Kyndal entered into a joint venture with John Fergus & Co Ltd to establish a new Scotch whisky distillery and bonded warehouse facility in Glenrothes. The new distillery, named Inchdairnie, focuses on exporting to markets in India, Africa and the Far East. It opened in May 2016 creating 15 new jobs as well as generating new exports worth a predicted £3.6 million to Scotland over the next three years. It is located at Whitehill Industrial Estate adjacent to Fife Airport. The distillery is one of the first in Scotland to embark on a significant decarbonisation programme and was awarded UK Government funding as part of a 'Green Distilleries Competition' in January 2021. This will specifically focus on the potential to use hydrogen at the distillery to significantly decarbonise the process heat required. The hydrogen could be produced two ways, by converting the gas generated at the local AD plant to hydrogen onsite and through electrolysis of local renewables onsite. This will reduce the overall carbon footprint of the distillery.

Roof window manufacturer Velux announced in October 2018 that it was delivering a £7 million expansion to its UK and Ireland headquarters in Glenrothes. The firm's head office building was renovated and a 3,500 square metre new build structure was developed alongside the existing office, housing a customer service centre, training facilities, office space, meeting suite and a staff restaurant. Like the current building, the extension showcases Velux products, such as its modular skylight system, flat roof windows and sun tunnels.

In 2021 a new plastics recycling plant was delivered at Whitehill industrial Estate, operated by Yes Recycling Group. Other organisations including Nestlé UK & Ireland and Zero Waste Scotland, have also been involved in the development of the plant, and supermarket chain Morrisons has acquired a “significant stake” in the facility. The plant has an “initial capacity” of 15,000 tonnes and will process hard-to-recycle soft plastic – including chocolate wrappers, crisp packets, and food film. Around 60 new jobs have been created following the opening of the facility.

Retail, leisure and service sectors

Retail jobs accounted for approximately 11% of the total number of jobs in the local economy in 2011. The majority of shopping, retail services and administrative facilities in Glenrothes are concentrated in the town centre (central business district). With approximately 120 shop units, the Kingdom Centre provides the largest concentration of retail and services in the town centre. New shop units were delivered at North Street in late 2018/early 2019 anchored by a M&S foodhall.
Community and commercial leisure facilities within the town centre include the Rothes Halls complex; Glenrothes' principal theatre, library, civic and exhibition centre. A cinema, restaurant, pub and bingo hall complex are located adjacent to the Kingdom Centre at Carrick Gate/Church Street. Ten-pin bowling facilities are available at Albany Gate. 
A number of retail operators including the town's major supermarkets are also located in the Queensway business park located adjacent to the town centre. The town's largest retail employers, Asda and Morrisons, both trade from large stores there. A retail park has also been constructed at the Saltire Centre, approximately half of a mile (1 km) to the southwest of the town centre containing major stores including Matalan and Homebase. An indoor trampoline centre also operates at the Saltire Retail Park.

Other types of service industries also add to the town's economic mix with large single employers being in the 'accommodation and food services' sector which accounted for around 4% of the town's total jobs. Balbirnie House Hotel and Balgeddie House Hotel (a Best Western hotel) are the largest hotel operators in the immediate area. Budget hotel chains are also represented with Wetherspoons operating a hotel and pub, the Golden Acorn Hotel, in the town centre. Premier Inn, Travelodge and Holiday Inn also operate hotels within Glenrothes.

Financial and professional services represent 15.6% of the total number of jobs. Offices are mainly concentrated in the town centre and at Pentland Park. An enterprise hub facility was opened in the town centre in 2017 to act as a "one-stop shop" supplying increased enterprise and business services to potential entrepreneurs in the local area.

Public and voluntary sectors
A number of public service and third sector agencies and authorities are based in Glenrothes contributing to the town's administrative centre function. Police Scotland has established its Fife Division headquarters in Glenrothes at Viewfield. Scottish Environment Protection Agency (SEPA), Scottish Enterprise and Kingdom Housing Association, a major Registered Social Landlord also have offices in Glenrothes at Pentland Park; a business park within the town. Fife College is also a key employer in Glenrothes with a large campus based at Stenton Road adjacent to Viewfield Industrial Estate. Fife Council is a major employer in the locality with its prominent local authority headquarters building located in Glenrothes town centre. Many of the other council departments are contained in a number of the town centre's office blocks and a major depot and office facility is located at Bankhead in the former ADC building.

Regeneration and future development
A range of development projects are proposed to regenerate the town centre steered by a masterplan that was approved by the Glenrothes Area Committee in March 2021. This seeks to address a variety of negative trends including addressing the loss of shops and a halving of office floorspace since the year 2000. Celebrating the unique legacy of public art bequeathed to the town, introducing new business opportunities outwith the Kingdom Shopping Centre, creating new public spaces including a new town square, and supporting an enhanced evening economy are also identified in the masterplan. This supersedes an earlier Glenrothes town centre action plan that was approved at Glenrothes Area Committee in 2014. Older parts of the Kingdom Shopping Centre at Albany Gate are proposed to be demolished and redeveloped.

Glenrothes is to be home to the UK's First 100% Green Data Centre which is to be built at Queensway Technology Park. Once complete this will represent a significant economic development for the area and will play a strategically important part in Scotland's IT infrastructure transformation as a whole. The £40 million development will create over 300 construction jobs during the build process and up to 50 full-time posts created on completion, including technical and operational staff. The facility will be the first of its kind in the UK drawing its energy from a renewable source with power coming directly from the RWE biomass plant in the town. Queensway Data Centre will accommodate up to 1500 high performance computer racks offering the highest levels of resilience and data security. The facility will be built to a BREEAM outstanding standard with a power usage effectiveness rating of less than 1.15.

There are also proposals to support the regeneration of the western neighbourhoods, centered around the Glenwood centre. A charrette was held in 2017, facilitated by PAS and supported by design experts, Fife Council and the Scottish Government. This was intended to inform an action plan for the future of the area.

Major housing developments are taking place in the area, including at the former Tullis Russell papermills, Cadham Road, Markinch South and at Westwood Park which will deliver over a thousand new build homes between 2022 to 2030.

Culture and community

Public artworks
In 1968 Glenrothes was the first town in the UK to appoint a town artist. This is now recognised as playing a significant role, both in a Scottish and in an international context, in helping to create the idea of art being a key factor in creating a sense of place. Two town artists, David Harding (1968–78) and Malcolm Robertson (1978–91), were employed in the lifetime of the Glenrothes Development Corporation (GDC). Both artists, supported by a number of assistants, created a large variety of artworks and sculptures that are scattered throughout the town.

Other artists have also contributed to the creation of the town's artworks. The first sculpture erected in Glenrothes was "Ex Terra", created by Benno Schotz which was inspired by the town's motto  (Latin) meaning "From the earth strength". "The Good Samaritan" sculpture in Riverside Park was produced by Edinburgh-based sculptor, Ronald Rae, who was commissioned by the GDC to produce a piece of art work in celebration of the town's 40th anniversary in 1988. The concrete hippos scattered throughout the town were designed and created by Stanley Bonnar who went on to be the town artist at East Kilbride.

Public parks and horticulture
The town has won numerous awards locally and nationally for the quality of its landscaping; something that is promoted by the "Take a Pride in Glenrothes" (TAPIG) group. The Glenrothes Development Corporation devoted around one third of land in Glenrothes to the provision of open space. As a consequence the town has numerous parks, the largest being Balbirnie Park, Carleton Park, Gilvenbank Park, Riverside Park, and Warout Park. The Lomond Hills Regional Park borders and enters the town to the north and east.

Civic and heritage facilities
Rothes Halls is the town's main theatre, exhibition, conference and civic centre. The town's main library and a cafe also form part of the complex. The Rothes Halls was officially opened by actor and director Richard Wilson on 30 November 1993. Since then it has played host to a vast range of local, national and international shows; popular music and entertainment acts, and amateur societies. It also hosts an annual Kingdom Of Fife Real Ale and Cider Festival, the Glenrothes comic con and a science festival.

The Glenrothes & Area Heritage Centre established a permanent base in November 2013 following a series of successful temporary exhibitions held previously in the town centre. The heritage centre is run by local volunteers and operates from a shop unit in the Kingdom Shopping Centre. It focuses on the history of the Glenrothes area from a period between the early 19th century to the late 20th century.

A war memorial was constructed in Glenrothes in 2007 following the deaths of two local Black Watch soldiers in Iraq. Prior to this Glenrothes was in the unusual position of not being able to host its own Remembrance Sunday commemorations. Unlike traditional memorials, the Glenrothes war memorial consists of two interlinking rings of standing stones.

Community hospital facilities
Glenrothes Hospital is a community hospital located in the Forresters Lodge area to the northwest of the town centre. Opened in October 1981 the hospital has over 80 nursing staff and over 60 beds, as well as around 20 day hospital beds. Glenrothes Hospital provides a wide range of services including; speech and language therapy, occupational therapy, physiotherapy, dietetics, district nurses, health visitors, podiatry, hospital pharmacy and x-ray services. There is, however, no accident and emergency service within this hospital.

Social clubs, organisations and community events
There are a number of social clubs and organisations operating within Glenrothes which contribute to the cultural and community offerings of the town. These include an art club, various youth clubs, a floral art club, amateur theatre groups, a choral society and a variety of sports clubs. Glenrothes hosts an annual gala which is held at Warout Park and has a variety of family activities including a dog show, highland dancing and a travelling funfair with stalls. Summer and winter festivals were held in Riverside Park in 2012. The summer festival included sporting events along with arts and crafts, food stalls and fairground shows. The winter festival coincided with bonfire night celebrations and included the town's annual fireworks display which was previously held at Warout Park. Markinch and Thornton each host an annual Highland Games and the other surrounding villages host their own annual gala days and festivals.

Sports facilities, clubs and events
The town has a large variety of established sports and leisure facilities. This includes two 18-hole golf courses (Glenrothes and Balbirnie), outdoor skateparks, an indoor trampoline park, an indoor ten-pin bowling alley, a football stadium at Warout Park, private gyms and the Michael Woods Sports and Leisure Centre which is a major sports complex located in Viewfield. The Sports Centre was named after the late SNP Councillor Michael Woods in a controversial decision taken by the Glenrothes Area Committee in 2012. The sports centre was recognised for its architectural quality in the 2014 Scottish Property Awards, coming second place in the Architectural Excellence Award for Public Buildings. In April 2018 a new state-of-the-art indoor training facility was developed adjacent to the Michael Woods Sports and Leisure Centre; the only facility of its kind in Fife. The indoor arena features a 3G football pitch allowing for seven-a-side and five-a-side matches. The facility, which was funded by Fife Council and sportscotland at a cost of £2.3 million, is also compliant for rugby training.

The town's football club is Glenrothes F.C., they compete in the East of Scotland League and play at Warout Stadium. The local rugby club is Glenrothes RFC who are based at Carleton Park and there is also a local cricket club who play at Gilvenbank Park. The Road Running Festival in Glenrothes is the largest annual sporting event in the town with over 1500 people of all ages and levels of fitness taking part and has been held annually since 1983. The town is also an established destination in hosting the BDO British International Championships for darts which are held annually at the town's CISWO club.

Town twinning
Glenrothes has a twin-town link with Böblingen, a city in Baden-Württemberg in Germany since 1971. As early as 1962 a local councillor had suggested that the town might "twin" with a town on the Continent. Some years later a friendship grew up between teachers at Glenrothes High School and the Gymnasium in Böblingen which eventually led to the twinning of the towns. Since then there have been a number of exchanges on official, club and personal levels.

Notable residents
Famous people associated with the town include the actor Dougray Scott who grew up in Glenrothes and attended Auchmuty High School.

Douglas Mason, known as one of the engineers of the "Thatcher revolution" and the "father of the poll tax" set up home in Glenrothes in the 1960s and spent most of his adult life living there.

Henry McLeish, the former First Minister of Scotland lived in Glenrothes, having been brought up in nearby Kennoway. Glenrothes town centre is home to the building involved in the notorious Officegate scandal, which ultimately led to McLeish's resignation as First Minister in 2001.

Tricia Marwick, the first female Presiding Officer of the Scottish Parliament served as MSP for Glenrothes.

John Wallace CBE, born in nearby Methilhill, like many of his extended family played in the Tullis Russell Mills Band; his father worked as a joiner in the late Tullis Russell Paper Mills. He became the only Scot to hold the position of Principal of the Royal Conservatoire of Scotland between 2002 to 2014.

The town has also been home to current and former professional football players including Kevin McHattie (Inverness Caledonian Thistle and previously Hearts), Billy MacKay (formally Rangers and Hearts) and David Speedie (formally Chelsea, Liverpool).

Sergeant were a four-piece indie rock band established in Glenrothes. In 2007 they signed a contract with Mercury Records and played at number of musical festivals including T in the Park and Glastonbury. The band also supported Oasis on four Scottish dates and also the Fratellis on their full UK tour.

Landmarks

The River Leven Bridge, which spans Riverside Park and carries the town's Western Distributor Road, is a cable-stayed bridge that was completed in 1995. The bridge was designed by Dundee-based Nicoll Russell Studios, Architects and was commissioned by the Glenrothes Development Corporation (GDC) as a landmark creating a gateway into Riverside Park that could be seen from further afield. The bridge was constructed by Balfour Beatty Construction (Scotland) and it was the first reinforced-concrete cable-stayed structure ever built in the UK.

A number of Glenrothes' artworks and sculptures act as landmarks at major gateways into the town, such as the "Giant Irises" at Leslie Roundabout, and the Glenrothes "Gateway Totum" at Bankhead Roundabout. Former town artist Malcolm Robertson produced the "Giant Irises" sculpture as Glenrothes' contribution to the Glasgow Garden Festival. The sculpture was the winner of the John Brown Clydebank award for the "Most Original and Amusing Artifact" and following the festival, it was re-erected at Leslie Roundabout. A number of other sculptures were relocated in 2011 to more visually prominent locations around the town creating new landmarks. Four pieces of Glenrothes artworks have been awarded listed status by Historic Scotland. "Ex Terra" has been listed at Category B and "The Birds", "The Henge" and "Work" (or Industry, Past and Present) at Category C. Historic Scotland has also produced a website, a video and an information brochure dedicated to the Glenrothes town art.

The town is also home to a number of churches which act as important landmarks due to their unique architectural styles and sometimes their locations at key road junctions. The three earliest churches are now listed buildings. These are St. Margaret's Church in Woodside (category C listed), St. Paul's RC Church in Auchmuty (category A listed), and St. Columba's Church on Church Street (category A listed) in the town centre. St. Paul's RC was designed by architects Gillespie, Kidd and Coia. In 1993 it was listed as one of sixty key monuments of post-war architecture by the international conservation organisation DoCoMoMo. The church sits at a junction between two main distributor roads. St Columba's Church, designed by architects Wheeler & Sproson, underwent significant restoration in 2009. Internally the church contains a large mural created by Alberto Morrocco titled 'The Way of the Cross', which was completed in 1962. Externally the church with its distinctive triangular iron bell tower and Mondrian inspired stained glass windows acts as a landmark at the south-western gateway to the town centre.

Balgonie Castle located to the east of Glenrothes on the south bank of the River Leven near Milton of Balgonie and Coaltown of Balgonie is also a local landmark. The castle keep dates from the 14th century, and the remaining structures were added piecemeal until the 18th century. The keep has been recently restored, although other parts of the castle are roofless ruins. The castle was awarded category A listing in 1972 by Historic Scotland.

Education

Early precincts in the town were served by their own primary schools which were to be provided on the basis of one school for every 1,000 houses. The first primary school to be opened in Glenrothes was Carleton Primary School, built in 1953 in Woodside. In total thirteen primary schools were developed in the town, twelve non-denominational and one to serve catholic pupils. In February 2014 Fife Council's executive committee voted to close one of Glenrothes' primary schools at Tanshall as part of a wider school estate review which sought to reduce costs. The closure faced considerable local opposition and the proposals were called-in by the Scottish Government, but ultimately the closure of the school went ahead as planned and it was demolished in 2016.

There are three secondary schools in Glenrothes, the earliest of which is Auchmuty High School, opened in 1957. Secondary Schools were to be provided on the basis of one school for every 4,000 houses. Glenwood High School was built in 1962 to serve the western precincts. Prior to 1966 older pupils had to attend schools in neighbouring towns to continue "Higher" examinations as Auchmuty and Glenwood only provided for pupils at junior secondary level. Glenrothes High School was built in 1966 to accommodate pupils at a higher level. However changes in the education system nationally meant that both Auchmuty and Glenwood were raised to full high school status in the 1970s. Auchmuty High School serves the east and southern parts of Glenrothes as well as the villages of Markinch, Coaltown of Balgonie and Thornton. As part of the £126 million Building Fife's Future Project a replacement for Auchmuty was completed and opened to pupils in 2013. Glenrothes High School serves the central and northern areas in the town. Glenwood High School serves the western parts of Glenrothes and the villages of Leslie and Kinglassie. Catholic pupils in Glenrothes attend St Andrew's High School in neighbouring Kirkcaldy.

Further education in the town is provided at Fife College. Construction of a Glenrothes college campus began in the early 1970s, originally specialising in paper manufacturing, mechanical engineering and electrical engineering courses. A second institute known as FIPRE (Fife Institute of Physical and Recreational Education) was built adjacent catering for sport and physical education as well as providing a sports centre for the town. The Glenrothes campus of the college is located at Stenton Road in Viewfield. This was significantly extended in 2010 with the development of the "Future Skills Centre". It includes departments in engineering, construction, renewables and science to cater for emerging industries specialising in renewable energy and low carbon technologies as well as provide training for major engineering projects.

Transport

Glenrothes has a planned road network with original masterplans establishing the principle that "through traffic" be bypassed around the housing precincts by a network of "Freeway" and "Highway" distributor roads. These would connect each precinct to the purposely designed town centre and to the industrial estates. Another element that was adopted was the use of roundabouts at junctions instead of traffic lights which would allow traffic to flow freely.

The town has direct dual-carriageway access to the M90 via the A92 Trunk Road. The A92 passes north–south through the town and connects Glenrothes with Dundee in the north and Dunfermline in the southwest where it merges with the M90. This gives Glenrothes a continuous dual-carriageway link to Edinburgh and the major central Scotland road networks, whilst much of the route north to Dundee remains a single-carriageway. Local campaigners have for a number of years sought the upgrade of the A92 north of Glenrothes.

The A911 road passes east/west through the town and connects it with Levenmouth in the east and Milnathort and the M90 in the west. The B921 Kinglassie Road, described in early masterplans as the Southern Freeway, links Glenrothes to the former mining communities of Cardenden and Kinglassie, and to Westfield. The route is a dual carriageway between Bankhead Roundabout and as far west as Fife Airport. Early masterplans show that this route was originally intended to be upgraded to provide dualled connections to the A92 Chapel junction in Kirkcaldy, however this has never been implemented.

The town has a major bus station in the town centre providing frequent links to the cities of Dundee, Edinburgh, Glasgow and Perth as well as to surrounding towns and villages. Two railway stations on the edge of the main town serve the Glenrothes area - Glenrothes with Thornton railway station and Markinch railway station. Glenrothes is home to an airfield, Fife Airport (ICAO code EGPJ), which is used for general aviation with private light aircraft. Edinburgh Airport is the nearest international airport to Glenrothes, Dundee Airport operates daily flights to London, Birmingham and Belfast.

A purposely designed pedestrian and cycle system was also created using a network of ring and radial routes throughout the town. This includes a near three mile continuous linear cycle path, called Boblingen Way, which extends across the length of Glenrothes, from Leslie in the west, to Woodside in the east.

Glenrothes is connected to the National Cycle Network via Route 766 which runs north from Kirkcaldy to north of Glenrothes, linking to the wider network via Route 76 and Route 1. The Fife Pilgrim Way is a long-distance walking route covering a distance of around 64 miles between Culross, connecting a number of Fife’s villages, towns and countryside and terminating in St Andrews. The route passes through Glenrothes on a section of the route between Kinglassie in the southwest and Markinch in the east.

References

Notes

Bibliography

External links 

  (A selection of archive films about Glenrothes)

 
New towns in Scotland
Towns in Fife
Populated places established in 1948
1948 establishments in Scotland
Radburn design housing estates
New towns started in the 1960s